Sturmmann was a Nazi Party paramilitary rank that was first created in the year 1921. The rank of Sturmmann was used by the Sturmabteilung (SA) and the Schutzstaffel (SS).

The word originated during World War I when Sturmmann was a position held by soldiers in German pioneer assault companies, also known as "shock troops".

Creation 
Following the defeat of Germany in 1918, Sturmmann became a paramilitary rank of the Freikorps, violent groups of military veterans who opposed Germany's loss of World War I and the subsequent Treaty of Versailles.

In 1921, Sturmmann became a paramilitary title of the Nazi Party's private army, the Sturmabteilung (SA or "Assault Detachment"). Sturmmann would eventually become a basic paramilitary rank of almost every Nazi organization, but is most closely associated as an SA rank and as a rank of the SS.

The rank of Sturmmann was bestowed upon those members of the SA and SS who had served for six months in the organization and had demonstrated basic abilities and competence.

Use

Sturmmann was senior to the rank of Mann in the Allgemeine-SS (general-SS). In organizations which did not use the rank of Mann (such as the National Socialist Motor Corps), the rank of Sturmmann was the equivalent of a private and wore a blank collar patch with no insignia. Within the Waffen-SS, an SS-Sturmmann was senior to an SS-Oberschütze.

The rank of Sturmmann was junior, in both the SS and SA, to the rank of Rottenführer. It was considered the equivalent to the rank of Gefreiter in the German Army and a lance-corporal in the British Army. The insignia for Sturmmann consisted of a bare collar patch with a single silver stripe. The field grey uniforms of the Waffen-SS also displayed the sleeve chevron of a Gefreiter.

Insignia

Post-war use 
The term and rank has not been used in Germany since World War II.

See also 
 Table of ranks and insignia of the Waffen-SS

Notes

Bibliography 

 
 
 
 
 

SS ranks